P. prasina  may refer to:
 Palomena prasina, the green shield bug, a shield bug species
 Paramantis prasina, a praying mantis species

See also
 Prasina (disambiguation)